Khachik is a village in the Areni Municipality of the Vayots Dzor Province in Armenia, located on the Armenia–Azerbaijan border. The village is the home to the fourth Infantry unit of Vayk Brigade.

Gallery

References

External links 

Populated places in Vayots Dzor Province